Viska or Víska may refer to:

Places in the Czech Republic
Malá Víska, a municipality and village in the Central Bohemian Region
Víska (Havlíčkův Brod District), a municipality and village in the Vysočina Region
Víska u Jevíčka, a municipality and village in the Pardubice Region

People
Mark Viska, Australian rules footballer